Tijani Ahmed (born 5 November 2004) is a Ghanaian professional footballer who last played as a forward for Ghanaian Premier League side Accra Great Olympics.

Career

Early career 
Ahmed played for then Accra Hearts of Oak's youth team Auroras FC who play in the Ghana Division Two League.

Great Olympics 
He moved to city rival Accra Great Olympics in 2019, signing a two-year contract to expire in 2021. He did not feature in the league but was named in the bench for two matches in the 2019–20 Ghana Premier League season before the league was put on hold and later cancelled due to the COVID-19 pandemic. His name was included team's squad list for the 2020–21 Ghana Premier League. On 13 December 2020, he made his debut after coming on in the 80th minute for Maxwell Abbey Quaye in a 2–0 loss against Liberty Professionals. He featured in just 2 league matches in the first round of the season before he was released by the club in March 2021.

References

External links 

 

Living people
1998 births
Association football forwards
Ghanaian footballers
Ghana Premier League players
Accra Great Olympics F.C. players